Joseph A. Matos III is a United States Marine Corps brigadier general who serves as the Director of Information, Command, Control, Communications, and Computers of the U.S. Marine Corps. He previously was the Director of Command, Control Communications, Computers, and Cyber of the United States Space Command.

References

External links

Year of birth missing (living people)
Living people
Place of birth missing (living people)
United States Marine Corps generals